Events from the year 1953 in the United Kingdom. This is the year of the coronation of Queen Elizabeth II and the North Sea flood.

Incumbents
 Monarch – Elizabeth II
 Prime Minister – Winston Churchill (Conservative)
Parliament – 40th

Events

 28 January – Nineteen-year old Derek Bentley is hanged at Wandsworth Prison in London for his part in the murder of PC Sidney Miles.
 31 January – Car ferry , sailing from Stranraer, Scotland, to Larne, Northern Ireland, sinks in the Irish Sea killing 133 people on board. Among the dead are: Northern Ireland Finance Minister and Deputy Prime Minister Major Maynard Sinclair, and Sir Walter Smiles, the Ulster Unionist MP for North Down.
 31 January–1 February – The North Sea flood of 1953 kills 307 people on the east coast of Britain, with more at sea. A corvette and a submarine sink at their moorings in HM Dockyard Sheerness.
 1 February – Pool petrol, introduced during World War II, is replaced by individual brands.
 5 February – Rationing of sweets, introduced during World War II, ends.
 28 February – James D. Watson and Francis Crick announce that they have discovered the structure of the DNA molecule.
 4 March – Tommy Taylor, 21-year-old centre forward, becomes Britain's most expensive footballer in a £29,999 transfer from Barnsley to Manchester United.
 16 March – Josip Tito, the leader of Yugoslavia visits the UK, the first Communist leader to do so.
 24 March
 Queen Mary, consort of the late King George V dies in her sleep at Marlborough House.
 The 10 Rillington Place murders are uncovered in London.
 31 March – The funeral of Queen Mary takes place at St George's Chapel, Windsor Castle.

 13 April – Ian Fleming publishes his first James Bond novel, Casino Royale.
 15 April – Britain awards the George Medal to 22-year-old American airman Reis Leming who rescued 27 people in last winter's floods in East Anglia.
 16 April – The Queen launches the Royal Yacht Britannia at John Brown & Company shipbuilders on the Clyde.
 24 April – Prime Minister Winston Churchill receives a knighthood from the Queen.
 25 April – Francis Crick and James D. Watson publish their description of the double helix structure of DNA in the paper "Molecular structure of Nucleic Acids".
 2 May – Blackpool F.C. win the FA Cup final with a 4–3 victory over Bolton Wanderers, who have been 3–1 ahead until the final quarter of the game. Stan Mortensen scores a hat-trick, but the 38-year-old winger Stanley Matthews is instrumental in winning the game for Blackpool, who have never won a major trophy before.
 25 May – Whitsun bank holiday; many businesses postpone the holiday for a week.  

 2 June
 The coronation of Queen Elizabeth II takes place at Westminster Abbey, celebrated as a public holiday.
 The Times exclusively carries James Morris's scoop of the conquest of Mount Everest by a British expedition on 29 May.
 6 June – The Epsom Derby is won by Pinza, the only Derby victory for Gordon Richards at his 28th attempt, days after becoming the only jockey to be made a knight. The Queen's horse, Aureole, finishes second.
 23 June – Prime Minister Winston Churchill, 78, suffers a stroke at a dinner for the Italian Prime Minister Alcide De Gasperi. On 27 June the public are told that he is suffering from fatigue.
 25 June – John Christie, a 54-year-old Londoner, is sentenced to death for the murder of his wife Ethel Christie. A total of eight bodies have been found at Christie's home, 10 Rillington Place in Notting Hill, including those of the wife and daughter of Timothy Evans who had been hanged in 1950 for his daughter's murder.
 26 June – Eskdalemuir enters the UK Weather Records for the highest rainfall in a 30-minute period with 80mm, a record that will remain for at least sixty years.
 30 June – First roll-on/roll-off ferry crossing of the English Channel, Dover–Boulogne.
 15 July – John Christie is hanged at Pentonville Prison, where a crowd of some two hundred people stand to wait for the notice of execution to be posted.
 18 July – The Quatermass Experiment, first of the Quatermass science-fiction serials by Nigel Kneale, begins its run on BBC Television.
 20 July – The Good Old Days, filmed at the Leeds City Varieties, begins its 30-year run on BBC Television.
 19 August
 The England cricket team under Len Hutton defeat Australia to win The Ashes for the first time in nineteen years.
 Iranian coup d'état ("Operation Boot"): Overthrow of the democratically elected Prime Minister of Iran by Iranian military in favour of strengthening the rule of Shah Mohammad Reza Pahlavi with the support of the United States and UK.
 Autumn – Myxomatosis reaches the UK, first being illegally introduced onto an estate in West Sussex.
 19 September – Sir Hubert Parry's 1916 setting of William Blake's "Jerusalem" first appears as a permanent feature of the Last Night of the Proms (televised).
 26 September – End of post-war sugar rationing.
 6 October – The government sends troops to the colony of British Guiana, blaming Communists for causing unrest.
 27 October – Arbroath life-boat Robert Lindsay capsizes on service: six crew killed.
 November – The first production Blue Danube atomic bomb, the first British-developed and -built nuclear weapon, is delivered to the Bomber Command stockpile at RAF Wittering, concluding the High Explosive Research project to develop it.
 2 November – The Samaritans telephone counselling service for the suicidal is started by Rev. Chad Varah in London.
 11 November – Current affairs series Panorama first airs on BBC Television, it will still be running more than seventy years later.
 17 November – Italian cargo steamer Vittoria Claudia sinks after collision with French motor vessel Perou in the English Channel, killing twenty Italian sailors.
 20 November – The Piltdown Man, which was discovered in 1912 and thought to be the fossilised remains of a hitherto unknown form of early human, is exposed as a hoax.
 25 November – Match of the Century: England v Hungary football match at Wembley Stadium results in a 6–3 defeat suffered by the England national football team against Hungary, ending a 90-year unbeaten home run against sides from outside the British Isles.
 26 November – The House of Lords votes in favour of the government's proposals for commercial television.
 30 November – Kabaka crisis: Edward Mutesa II, the kabaka (king) of Buganda, is deposed and exiled to London by Sir Andrew Benjamin Cohen, Governor of Uganda.
 c. December – Matchbox toy vehicles are introduced by Lesney Products of London.
 10 December
 Winston Churchill wins the Nobel Prize in Literature "for his mastery of historical and biographical description as well as for brilliant oratory in defending exalted human values".
 Hans Adolf Krebs wins the Nobel Prize in Physiology or Medicine "for his discovery of the citric acid cycle".
 Pilkington Brothers take out their first patent for the float glass process developed by Alastair Pilkington.

Undated
 Michael Ventris deciphers the Minoan language Linear B.
 First Italian espresso coffee bar opens in the UK, The Moka in Frith Street, Soho, London.
 Jazz musician John Dankworth sets up his big band, the Johnny Dankworth Orchestra.
 Laura Ashley sells her first printed fabrics.
 J. C. Bamford of Rocester introduce the backhoe loader.
 E. Gomme introduce the popular G-Plan furniture range.
 House of Fraser take over the Sunderland-based Binns group of department stores.
 Some 25% of British households now own a television set, seventeen years after the first sets became available. Many families buy a set this year to watch the Coronation of Elizabeth II.

Publications
 Agatha Christie's novels After the Funeral (Hercule Poirot) and A Pocket Full of Rye (Miss Marple).
 Gerald Durrell's first book, The Overloaded Ark.
 Lawrence Durrell's book Reflections on a Marine Venus.
 Islwyn Ffowc Elis's Welsh novel Cysgod y Cryman
 Ian Fleming's first James Bond novel, Casino Royale.
 L. P. Hartley's novel The Go-Between.
 C. S. Lewis' novel The Silver Chair.
 Evelyn Waugh's novel Love Among the Ruins. A Romance of the Near Future.
 Geoffrey Willans and Ronald Searle's Molesworth book Down With Skool.
 John Wyndham's novel The Kraken Wakes.

Births
 1 January – Maureen Beattie, Irish-born Scottish actress
 4 January 
Jackie Ballard, journalist and politician
Richard Boden, director and producer
Vicki Bruce, psychologist and academic
6 January - Malcolm Young, Scottish-born Australian guitarist (died 2017)
 11 January –  John Sessions, actor (died 2020)
 19 January –  Linda Hayden, actress
 29 January 
Ronnie Moore, footballer and manager
Richard Younger-Ross, politician
 17 February – Norman Pace, actor and comedian
 18 February – Ian Jenkins, archaeologist and curator (died 2020)
 22 February – Geoffrey Perkins, comedy producer, writer and performer (died 2008)
 3 March – Robyn Hitchcock, alternative rock singer-songwriter
 26 March – Christopher Fowler, thriller writer
 4 April – Sammy Wilson, Northern Irish politician
 9 April – John Howard, glam-pop singer-songwriter
 11 April – Andrew Wiles, mathematician known for proving Fermat's Last Theorem
 13 April – Stephen Byers, politician
 18 April – Steven Pimlott, theatre director (died 2007)
 20 April – Sebastian Faulks, novelist
 24 April – Tim Woodward, screen actor
 26 April – David Reddaway, Canadian-English diplomat, British High Commissioner to Canada
 6 May
 Tony Blair, Prime Minister (1997-2007)
 Graeme Souness, Scottish footballer and manager
 7 May – Ian McKay, soldier, recipient of VC posthumously (killed 1982)
 10 May – John Diamond, journalist (died 2001)
 15 May – Mike Oldfield, musician
 19 May – Victoria Wood, comic performer (died 2016)
 21 May – Jim Devine, politician
 24 May – Alfred Molina, actor
 26 May – Michael Portillo, politician
 31 May – Linda Riordan, politician 
 2 June – Dave Boy Green, boxer and businessman
 3 June – John Moulder-Brown, actor
 7 June – Johnny Clegg, mbaqanga and Afro-pop musician and musical anthropologist (died 2019)
 8 June – Billy Hayes, trade union leader
 19 June – Hilary Jones, physician, television host and media personality
 23 June – John Stahl, Scottish actor (died 2022)
 26 June – Neil Record, businessman, author and economist
 1 July – Alan Sunderland, footballer
 4 July – Francis Maude, politician
 15 July – John Denham, politician
 21 July – David Ervine, leader of the Progressive Unionist Party (died 2007)
 24 July – Julian Brazier, politician
 29 July – Willie Donald, Scottish cricket player and administrator (died 2022)
 8 August – Nigel Mansell, racing driver
 9 August – Roberta Tovey, actress
 15 August – Carol Thatcher, journalist, and Mark Thatcher
 16 August – David Spiegelhalter, statistician
 18 August – Patrick Cowdell, English boxer
 23 August – Bobby G (Robert Gubby), singer (Bucks Fizz)
 2 September – Keith Allen, actor
 12 September – Fiona Mactaggart, educator and politician
 27 September – Diane Abbott, politician
 10 October – Janet Bloomfield, disarmament campaigner (died 2007)
 12 October – Les Dennis, television presenter, actor and comedian
 13 October – John Simpson, lexicographer and scholar
 21 October – Peter Mandelson, politician
 24 October 
 John Barton, English footballer and manager
 Andrew Turner, academic and politician
 David Wright, composer and music producer
 26 October – Roger Allam, actor
 27 October
 Paul Alcock, football referee (died 2018)
 Peter Firth, actor
 28 October – Phil Dwyer, Welsh footballer (died 2021)
 4 November – Peter Lord, British film producer and director
 7 November – Lucinda Green, equestrian
 11 November – Andy Partridge, rock singer-songwriter
 16 November – Griff Rhys Jones, comedian, actor and writer
 26 November – Hilary Benn, politician
 28 November – Alistair Darling, politician
 29 November – Rose West, serial killer
 2 December – David Anderson, English miner and politician
 6 December – Geoff Hoon, politician
 13 December – Jim Davidson, comedian

Deaths
 13 January – Sir Edward Marsh, polymath and civil servant (born 1872)
 28 January – Derek Bentley, criminal (born 1933) (hanged)
 29 January
 Sir Norman MacEwen, RAF commander (born 1881)
 Sir Reginald Wingate, general and colonial administrator (born 1861)
 9 February – Cecil Hepworth, film director (born 1874)
 23 February – Sir Cecil Hunter-Rodwell, colonial administrator (born 1874)
 24 March – Queen Mary, consort of King George V, grandmother of Queen Elizabeth II (born 1867)
 6 April – Idris Davies, Welsh poet (born 1905)
 9 April – C. E. M. Joad, philosopher and broadcaster (born 1891)
 25 May – Edmund Dulac, French-born illustrator and designer (Wilding series) (born 1882)
 1 June – Alex James, footballer (born 1901)
 16 June – Margaret Bondfield, politician and trade unionist (born 1873)
 9 July – Annie Kenney, suffragette (born 1879)
 15 July – John Christie, serial killer (born 1899) (hanged)
 16 July – Hilaire Belloc, writer (born 1870)
 18 July – Lucy Booth, Salvationist, fifth daughter of William and Catherine Booth (born 1868)
 29 July – Rosa May Billinghurst, suffragette (born 1875)
 30 September
 Robert Mawdesley, stage and radio actor (born c. 1900)
 Lewis Fry Richardson, mathematical physicist (born 1881)
 3 October – Sir Arnold Bax, composer (born 1883)
 8 October
 Nigel Bruce, character actor (born 1895)
 Kathleen Ferrier, contralto (born 1912)
 14 October – Arthur Wimperis, illustrator and playwright (born 1874)
 20 October – Sir Robert Brooke-Popham, air chief marshal (born 1878)
 21 October – Sir Muirhead Bone, etcher (born 1876)
 27 October – Thomas Wass, cricketer (born 1873)
 9 November – Dylan Thomas, Welsh poet and author (born 1914)
 27 November – T. F. Powys, novelist (born 1875)
 29 November – Ernest Barnes, mathematician, scientist, theologian and Bishop of Birmingham (born 1874)
 25 December – William Haselden, cartoonist (born 1872)<ref>Mr. W. K. Haselden, Kindly Cartoonist, Obituary, The Times, 29 December 1953<?ref>

See also
 1953 in British music
 1953 in British television
 List of British films of 1953

References

 
Years of the 20th century in the United Kingdom